Pedro Mairal (born 1970) is an Argentinian novelist, poet and musician. He has published more than a dozen books, among them the novel La Uruguaya which won the Premio Juan Tigre in 2017. His work has been translated into French, German, Arabic, English and Dutch. In 2007, he was named as one of the Bogota39, a selection of the best young writers in Latin America. He also is part of the Generation of 90, with other argentine writers such as Fabián Casas, Santiago Vega, Samanta Schweblin and Selva Almada.

Biography

Early Years 
Pedro Mairal was born in Buenos Aires, Argentina, on September 27, 1970.  He began studying medicine in 1989, but soon stopped.  In 1991 he began studying language and literature at the Universidad del Salvador (Argentina).  He published his first poems in the literary supplement of La Prensa in 1994. He is an adjunct professor of English literature at the Universidad del Salvador.

References

Argentine writers
1970 births
Living people
Place of birth missing (living people)
Date of birth missing (living people)